Tuxedo Junction is a 1941 American comedy film directed by Frank McDonald, written by Dorrell McGowan and Stuart E. McGowan, and starring the vaudeville comedy troupe the Weaver Brothers and Elviry, with Thurston Hall, Frankie Darro and Sally Payne. It was released on November 25, 1941, by Republic Pictures.

Plot

Cast 
Leon Weaver as Abner Weaver
June Weaver as Elviry Weaver
Frank Weaver as Cicero Weaver
Thurston Hall as Doug Gordon
Frankie Darro as Jack 'Sock' Anderson
Sally Payne as Pansy Weaver
Clayton Moore as Bill Bennett
Lorna Gray as Joan Gordon
William "Billy" Benedict as Thomas 'Piecrust' Murphy 
Ken Lundy as Fred 'Soapy' Peters 
Howard Hickman as Judge Leo Rivers 
Leonard Carey as Jenkins
Betty Blythe as Miss Hornblower
Sam Flint as Judge Lewis

References

External links 
 

1941 films
American comedy films
1941 comedy films
Republic Pictures films
Films directed by Frank McDonald
American black-and-white films
1940s English-language films
1940s American films